Castelpagano is a comune (municipality) in the Province of Benevento in the Italian region Campania, located about 80 km northeast of Naples and about 30 km north of Benevento.

Castelpagano borders the following municipalities: Cercemaggiore, Circello, Colle Sannita, Riccia, Santa Croce del Sannio.

References

Cities and towns in Campania